The Macchiaioli were a group of  Italian painters active in Tuscany in the second half of the nineteenth century.  They strayed from antiquated conventions taught by the Italian art academies, and did much of their painting outdoors in order to capture natural light, shade, and colour. This practice relates the Macchiaioli to the French Impressionists who came to prominence a few years later, although the Macchiaioli pursued somewhat different purposes. The most notable artists of this movement were Giuseppe Abbati, Cristiano Banti, Odoardo Borrani, Vincenzo Cabianca, Adriano Cecioni, Vito D'Ancona, Serafino De Tivoli, Giovanni Fattori, Raffaello Sernesi, Silvestro Lega and Telemaco Signorini.

The movement

The movement originated with a small group of artists, many of whom had been revolutionaries in the uprisings of 1848.  In the late 1850s, the artists met regularly at the Caffè Michelangiolo in Florence to discuss art and politics. These idealistic young men, dissatisfied with the art of the academies, shared a wish to reinvigorate Italian art by emulating the bold tonal structure they admired in such old masters as Rembrandt, Caravaggio and Tintoretto. They also found inspiration in the paintings of their French contemporaries of the Barbizon school.

They believed that areas of light and shadow, or "macchie" (literally patches or spots) were the chief components of a work of art. The word macchia was commonly used by Italian artists and critics in the nineteenth century to describe the sparkling quality of a drawing or painting, whether due to a sketchy and spontaneous execution or to the harmonious breadth of its overall effect.

In its early years the new movement was ridiculed. A hostile review published on November 3, 1862 in the journal Gazzetta del Popolo marks the first appearance in print of the term Macchiaioli. The term carried several connotations: it mockingly implied that the artists' finished works were no more than sketches, and recalled the phrase  "darsi alla macchia", meaning, idiomatically, to hide in the bushes or scrubland. The artists did, in fact, paint much of their work in these wild areas. This sense of the name also identified the artists with outlaws, reflecting the traditionalists' view that new school of artists was working outside the rules of art, according to the strict laws defining artistic expression at the time.

Although the Macchiaioli have often been compared to the Impressionists, they did not go as far as their younger French contemporaries in the pursuit of optical effects. Erich Steingräber says the Macchiaioli "declined to divide up their palette into the components of the colour-spectrum, and did not paint blue shadows. This is why their pictures lack the all-penetrating light that eclipses colours and contours and gives rise to the 'vibrism' peculiar to Impressionist painting. The independent identity of the individual figures is unimpaired."

The verdict that the Macchiaioli were "failed impressionists" has been countered by an alternative view which places the Macchiaioli in a category of their own, a decade ahead of the Parisian impressionists. This interpretation views the Macchiaioli as early modernists, with their broad theories of painting capturing the essence of subsequent movements that would not see the light of day for another decade or more. In this view the Macchiaioli emerge as being very much embedded in their social fabric and context, literally fighting alongside Giuseppe Garibaldi on behalf of the Risorgimento and its ideals.  As such, their works provide comments on various socio-political topics, including Jewish emancipation, prisons and hospitals, and women's conditions, including the plight of war widows and life behind the lines.

The Macchiaioli did not follow Monet's practice of finishing large paintings entirely en plein air, but rather used small sketches painted out-of-doors as the basis for works finished in the studio.

Many of the artists of the Macchiaioli died in penury, achieving fame only towards the end of the 19th century. Today the work of the Macchiaioli is much better known in Italy than elsewhere; much of the work is held, outside the public record, in private collections there.

Other painters, such as Luigi and Flavio Bertelli and Antonino Sartini, were influenced by this movement, without being a full part of it.

The Macchiaioli were the subject of an exhibition at the Chiostro del Bramante in Rome, October 11, 2007 – February 24, 2008,  which traveled to the Villa Bardini in Florence, March 19 – June 22, 2008. An exhibition in Venice, at the Istituto Veneto di Scienze, Lettere ed Arti showed the capolavori della collezione Mario Taragoni from March 8 - July 27, 2008. Another exhibition of the Macchiaioli was held at the Terme Tamerici in Montecatini Terme, August 12, 2009 – March 18, 2010. The Musée de l'Orangerie in Paris mounted an exhibition of the Macchiaioli April 10 – July 22, 2013.

Gallery

See also
Hudson River School
Barbizon School
Caffè Michelangiolo

Notes

References
Boime, Albert (1993). The Art of the Macchia and the Risorgimento. Chicago and London: The University of Chicago Press. 
Broude, Norma (1987). The Macchiaioli: Italian Painters of the Nineteenth Century. New Haven and London: Yale University Press. 
Steingräber, E., & Matteucci, G. (1984). The Macchiaioli: Tuscan Painters of the Sunlight : March 14-April 20, 1984. New York: Stair Sainty Matthiesen in association with Matthiesen, London. 
Turner, J. (1996). Grove Dictionary of Art. USA: Oxford University Press.

Further reading
 Piero Bargellini, Caffè Michelangiolo, Firenze, Vallecchi Editore, 1944.
Panconi, T. (1999). Antologia dei Macchiaioli, La trasformazione sociale e artica nella Toscana di metà 800. Pisa (Italy): Pacini Editore.
Panconi, T. (2009). I Macchiaioli, Il Nuovo dopo la Macchia. Pisa (Italy): Pacini Editore. 
Durbe, Dario (1978). I Macchiaioli. Rome: DeLuca Editore.

Italian art movements
Modern art
Landscape art by school
Painters from Tuscany
Italian artist groups and collectives